Maria Despas  (born 3 May 1967) is an Australian freestyle skier. She was born in Sydney. She competed at the 1998 and 2002 Winter Olympics, in women's moguls.

References

External links 
 

1967 births
Living people
Skiers from Sydney
Australian female freestyle skiers
Olympic freestyle skiers of Australia
Freestyle skiers at the 1998 Winter Olympics
Freestyle skiers at the 2002 Winter Olympics
Sportswomen from New South Wales
21st-century Australian women